Presidential elections were held in Transnistria on 11 December 2011. As no candidate received more than 50% of the vote in the first round, a run-off was held on 25 December.

Candidates
Incumbent president Igor Smirnov, running for re-election, had been in power since Transnistria declared independence in 1990, and was not term-limited.

Candidate registration was open from 11 September to 11 November. On 14 September, opposition MP and former speaker of the Supreme Council Yevgeny Shevchuk was the first to nominate himself at the CEC. Shevchuk is affiliated with Obnovlenie, who are already supporting Kaminski, signalling a possible split. Shevchuk had been followed by Pridnestrovie Communist Party chairman and MP Oleg Khorzhan, as well as newspaper editor Andrey Safonov, who was also a candidate in the 2006 election.

On 28 September, Proriv founder and MP Dmitry Soin also nominated himself as a candidate.

Soin, Smirnov, Khorzhan, Safonov, Shevchuk and Kaminsky were registered as candidates, Safonov was initially refused registration by CEC with reference to more than 15% of invalid signatures among those gathered in his support, but later registered according to a ruling by Tiraspol city court.

Results
An exit poll taken showed Smirnov in the lead in the first round with 47.38%, with opposition vote split between Shevchuk (23.21%) and Kaminski (22.6%). Transnistrian law requires a majority to be elected, meaning a second round would be necessary. After the first round, Smirnov called for the results to be annulled due to irregularities. The announcement of results was postponed from 12 to 14 December. Preliminary results (at 95% counted) showed that Smirnov was only in third place with 25.5%, with Shevchuk at 39% and Kaminski at 27.7% reaching the run-off round. Kaminski was reportedly Russia's preferred candidate.

A run-off was held on 25 December and won by Shevchuk, who was elected with 75% of the vote. His rival Anatoliy Kaminskiy received only 20% and acknowledged his defeat.

References

External links
Transnistrian Central Electoral Commission

2011 elections in Moldova
Elections in Transnistria
2011 in Transnistria
December 2011 events in Europe
Election and referendum articles with incomplete results